is the German word for both liberty and political freedom.

Freiheit may also refer to:

Political parties
 South Tyrolean Freedom (STF), a nationalist political party active in South Tyrol, a region of Italy historically ruled by Austria
 German Freedom Party, a political party in Germany

Newspapers and magazines
 Freiheit (1879) (1879–1910), an anarchist journal established by Johann Most in London and moved to New York
 Die Freiheit (1918), daily of the Independent Social Democratic Party of Germany
 Junge Freiheit, a German weekly newspaper with nationalistic tendencies
 Morgen Freiheit (1922–1988), Yiddish-language daily of the Communist Party USA

Culture
 Freiheit (film), a 1966 short film by George Lucas
 Freiheit (novel), a 2019 dystopian alternative history thriller by Ben Pickering
 Freiheit, the original title of Leo Perutz's 1918 novel From Nine to Nine
 Freiheit, an EP released in 2004 by Unheilig
 Freiheit, an album by German rapper Curse
 Münchener Freiheit (band), a German band also known as simply Freiheit
 "Freiheit" (song), a 1936 song by Gudrun Kabisch and Paul Dessau

Places
 Alte Freiheit, a historic square in Wuppertal-Elberfeld
 Freiheit (Königsberg), a type of medieval suburb of Königsberg
 Freiheit an der Aupa, former German name of the town Svoboda nad Úpou in the Czech Republic
 Große Freiheit, a cross street on the North Side to Hamburg's Reeperbahn
 Münchner Freiheit, a square in Munich's Schwabing

People
 David Freiheit (born 1979), Canadian YouTuber